Carlos Milthaler (born 12 June 1971) is a Chilean equestrian. He competed at the 2000 Summer Olympics and the 2012 Summer Olympics.

References

1971 births
Living people
Chilean male equestrians
Olympic equestrians of Chile
Equestrians at the 2000 Summer Olympics
Equestrians at the 2012 Summer Olympics
Equestrians at the 2007 Pan American Games
Place of birth missing (living people)
Pan American Games competitors for Chile
21st-century Chilean people